Sabir is a village and municipality in the Shamakhi Rayon of Azerbaijan.  It has a population of 4,055 (as of 2008).

References 

Populated places in Shamakhi District